The South New Jersey League was a minor league baseball league that played from 1895 to 1897. The Independent and Class D level South New Jersey League member teams were based exclusively in New Jersey.

History

The South New Jersey League was formed for the 1895 season as an Independent level minor league. The charter league members were the teams from Bridgeton, New Jersey, Millville and Salem, New Jersey. No 1895 league standings or statistics are known.

In 1896, the South New Jersey League became a Class D level league. The league became a four–team league, adding the Camden, New Jersey league as a member.

The South New Jersey League concluded play in 1897 as an Independent level league with four teams. The Vineland, New Jersey team joined Bridgeton, Millville and Salem in 1897 league play.

After the 1897 season was played, the South New Jersey League permanently folded. Bridgeton and Millville teams are also referenced to have played in the 1897 New Jersey State League which permanently folded on June 1, 1897, before completion of its only season.

South New Jersey League teams

Teams by season
1895: (3) Bridgeton, Millville, Salem
1896: (4) Bridgeton, Camden, Millville, Salem
1897: (4) Bridgeton, Clayton, Millville, Vineland

Notable league alumni

Ed Carfrey (1895), Salem
Bobby Cargo (1896), Millville
Alexander Donoghue (1895), Bridgeton
Dick Harley (1895), Millville
Heinie Kappel (1895), Bridgeton 
Joe Kappel (1895-1896), Bridgeton
Mike Kilroy (1896), Millville
Harry Morelock (1895), Millville
Doc Potts (1895), Millville
Bill Rotes (1895), Bridgeton
Bobby Rothermel (1896), Millville
Jack Scheible (1895), Bridgeton
Phenomenal Smith (1895), Millville
Farmer Steelman (1895), Millville
Pete Sweeney (1896), Salem
Frank Todd (1896), Millville
Stan Yerkes (1896), Bridgeton

References

Defunct minor baseball leagues in the United States
Baseball leagues in New Jersey
Sports leagues established in 1895
Sports leagues disestablished in 1897
1895 establishments in New Jersey